Jack Endino is an influential audio engineer and musician particularly associated with Seattle label Sub Pop and the grunge movement.

This list contains albums and EPs Endino has recorded, mixed, and/or produced, and is incomplete.

1986-1987
1986: Skin Yard – Skin Yard
1986: Dry as a Bone – Green River
1987: Screaming Life - Soundgarden

1988
1988: Secretions - Various Artists
1988: Superfuzz Bigmuff EP – Mudhoney
1988: Primal Rock Therapy EP – Blood Circus
1988: Sub Pop 200 - Various Artists
1988: Hallowed Ground - Skin Yard

1989
1989: God's Balls - TAD
1989: Roadmouth - Fluid
1989: Buzz Factory - Screaming Trees
1989: Bleach - Nirvana
1989: Psychosis - Coffin Break
1989: Journey to the Center of Cat Butt - Cat Butt
1989: Mudhoney - Mudhoney
1989: The Last Laugh - Helios Creed

1990
1990: The Thrown Ups - The Thrown Ups
1990: Angle of Attack - Jack Endino
1990: Fist Sized Chunks - Skin Yard
1990: Up in It - Afghan Whigs
1990: Fuck Me I'm Rich - Various Artists
1990: Solomon Grundy - Solomon Grundy
1990: Spanking Machine - Babes in Toyland
1990: The Winding Sheet - Mark Lanegan
1990: Blood Guts & Pussy - Dwarves
1990: Rupture - Coffin Break
1990: Highlights and Lowlives - Blue Cheer
1990: Time Whore - Treepeople
1990: Hymns for the Deranged - The Accüsed
1990: Grinning Like an Undertaker - The Accüsed
1990: Between the Eyes - Love Battery
1990: Smell The Magic - L7
1990: Inside Yours - Gruntruck

1991
1991: 1000 Smiling Knuckles - Skin Yard
1991: Despised - Seaweed
1991: Straight Razor - The Accüsed
1991: Janitors of Tomorrow - Gas Huffer
1991: Teriyaki Asthma Vol. 1-5 - Various Artists
1991: No Sleep Till the Stardust Motel - Coffin Break
1991: Crawl - Coffin Break
1991: The Grunge Years - Various Artists
1991: Guilt, Regret, Embarrassment Various 7 inches on Toxic Shock release - Treepeople

1992
1992: Weak - Seaweed
1992: Doom Picnic - Alien Boys
1992: Push - Gruntruck
1992: Thirteen - Coffin Break
1992: The Smoke of Hell - Supersuckers
1992: Mariposa - Rein Sanction
1992: Steel Mill - Willard
1992: Incesticide - Nirvana
1992: Integrity, Technology & Service - Gas Huffer
1992: Endino's Earthworm - Jack Endino

1993
1993: Circus of Values - Loveslug
1993: Titanomaquia - Titãs
1993: Inside the Eye - Skin Yard
1993: Toreador of Love - Hazel
1993: Painkiller - Babes in Toyland
1993: Here I Come and Other Hits - Fallouts
1993: Vena Cava - Dirt Fishermen
1993: Worth dying for - Boghandle

1994
1994: Whiskey for the Holy Ghost - Mark Lanegan
1994: Guillotina - Guillotina
1994: Kerbdog - Kerbdog
1994: Viva Zapata - Seven Year Bitch
1994: Where Am I? - Mike Johnson
1994: Let's Give it a Twist - Fitz of Depression
1994: No Return in the End - Smashing Orange
1994: Dive - Burning Heads
1994: Scream Clown Scream - Dancing French Liberals of '48
1994: The Shrill Beeps of Shrimp - Gas Huffer

1995
1995: My Brother the Cow - Mudhoney
1995: Infrared Riding Hood - Tad
1995: Return to Olympus - Malfunkshun (tracking only)
1995: Domingo - Titãs
1995: The Wilderness Years - Terry Lee Hale

1996
1996: Skunkworks - Bruce Dickinson
1996: Swing - Fitz of Depression
1996: Fear of Girls - Bluebottle Kiss
1996: Hype! the Motion Picture Soundtrack - Various Artists
1996: Rock Mata Pop - Guillotina

1997
1997: Tres Homeboys - Shark Chum
1997: Have a Nice Day, Motherfucker - Mono Men
1997: Seven Years Golden - The Thrown Ups

1998
1998: Kicked in the Teeth - ZEKE
1998: Ten Minute Warning - Ten Minute Warning (mix only)
1998: Live in Canada and Australia - Spiderbait
1998: O Que Voce Quiser - Baba Cosmica
1998: Psychopathia Sexualis - The Makers
1998: Empty Bottles, Broken Hearts - Murder City Devils
1998: Mientras El Resto Sigue - Guillotina
1998: Circular - Escarbarme

1999
1999: Nebula/Lowrider - Nebula
1999: Sun Creature - Nebula
1999: Vague Premonition - Elevator Through
1999: The Black Halos - The Black Halos
1999: Watts - Watts
1999: Trance States in Tongue - Zen Guerrilla
1999: To the Center - Nebula
1999: Greatest Rock 'n' Roll Band in the World - Supersuckers
1999: Escape - Burning Heads
1999: When the Word's On Fire - Quadrajets
1999: Kicked Out - RC5
1999: As Dez Mais - Titãs

2000
2000: Erre O Ce Ka - Guillotina
2000: March to Fuzz - Mudhoney
2000: Chemical Love Songs - More Republica Masonica
2000: Sessions '86-'88 - Bundle of Hiss
2000: Live from the Battle in Seattle - The No WTO Combo
2000: Seafish Louisville - The Gits
2000: Electric Children - The Monkeywrench

2001
2001: The Violent Years - The Black Halos
2001: The Grannies - The Grannies
2001: Kung Fu Cocktail Grip - Hog Molly
2001: What's in a Name? - The Fartz
2001: Gangsterland - Bluebottle Kiss
2001: Para Quando o Arco-Íris Encontrar o Pote de Ouro - Nando Reis
2001: Shadows on the Sun - Zen Guerilla
2001: Shameless - Therapy?
2001: American Rock and Roll - RC5
2001: Start at the Top - Skin Yard
2001: A Melhor Banda de Todos os Tempos da Última Semana - Titãs

2002
2002: Nirvana - Nirvana  (worked on two songs)
2002: Plasmic Tears and the Invisible City - Zen Guerilla
2002: Heavy Mellow 'Live' - Zen Guerilla
2002: Taste the Walker - The Grannies
2002: The Rest of Us - Gas Huffer
2002: Injustice - The Fartz
2002: Dos EPs - Nebula
2002: Dirty Power - Dirty Power
2002: Vandalism: Beautiful as a Rock in a Cop's Face - Feederz
2002: Make Up the Breakdown - Hot Hot Heat

2003
2003: Replica - Upwell
2003: Ordinary Miracles - Post Stardom Depression
2003: Frenching the Bully - The Gits
2003: CODEX1980 - SOLGER
2003: The Seattle Sessions - The Spades
2003: Enter: The Conquering Chicken - The Gits
2003: The Set-up - The Boss Martians
2003: Dancing - Harkonen

2004
2004: Optimus Rhyme - Optimus Rhyme
2004: Gotta Getaway! - RC5
2004: Kultura-Dictatura - Kultur Shock
2004: 'Til the Livin' End - ZEKE
2004: Like a Virgin EP - Harkonen/These Arms are Snakes
2004: Gold Star EP - Common Heroes 
2004: Going South - Going South
2004: Nibble the Giblet - Nitwitz
2004: Erected Lady Man - The Grannies
2004: Les Hell on Heels - Les Hell on Heels
2004: Volumen - Guillotina
2004: Dead Gone - Winnebago Deal
2004: Watch Me Burn - The Spazms
2004: Stripped - The Makers
2004: With the Lights Out - Nirvana
2004: Loud Fast Rock & Roll - Thunderfist

2005
2005: Number Nine - Upwell
2005: Oh Martha! - The Accüsed
2005: Alive Without Control - The Black Halos
2005: ZEKE and Peter Pan Speedrock Split - ZEKE
2005: Nice 'n' Ruff: Hard Soul Hits Vol. 1 - The DT's
2005: Everybody Rise! - The Makers
2005: MTV ao Vivo - Titãs
2005: Public Domain: The Best of Lucid Nation - Lucid Nation
2005: Permanent Fatal Error - Jack Endino
2005: Sliver: The Best of the Box - Nirvana

2006
2006: Sleepless in Seattle: Birth of Grunge - Various Artists
2006: The Baked Tapes - The Accüsed
2006: School the Indie Rockers - Optimus Rhyme
2006: Flight of the Raven - Winnebago Deal
2006: Gumjob - The Grannies
2006: Boxriff EP - The Atomic Bitchwax
2006: Too Fat For Love - Thunderfist

2007
2007: Filthy Habits - The DT's
2007: Teach Your Bird to Sing - Swallow
2007: Time Wasted is Not Wasted Time - Kandi Coded
2007: Incontinence (Outtakes & Demos) - The Grannies
2007: Death Is This Communion - High on Fire
2007: He Dies in Rocket School - Optimus Rhyme
2007: Dogs, Record & Wine - Les Hell on Heels
2007: Chemical Wedding - Chemical Wedding

2008
2008: Live in Europe - Kultur Shock
2008: We Are Not Alone - The Black Halos
2008: Sell the Sky - Upwell
2008: Sub Pop 300 - Various Artists
2008: Immortalizer - Valient Thorr
2008: One Million Dollar Surf Band - The Dead Rocks
2008: Tectonica - Slippage
2008: Back to Monkey City - Jeff Dahl
2008: Pressure in the S.O.D.O - The Boss Martians
2008: Guns of Nevada - Guns of Nevada
2008: Wishing Well - The Black Clouds

2009
2009: Love/Fight - Flipper
2009: Here Waits Thy Doom - 3 Inches of Blood
2009: Breathing the Fire - Skeletonwitch

2010
2010: Stranger - Valient Thorr
2010: DAMN! – Dragstrip Riot
2010: Infant Free Dumpster - The Sex Zombies

2011-present
2011: Resistance - The Ganjas
2011: For Those About to Forget to Rock - The Grannies
2012: Sei - Nando Reis
2012: Home Burial – Dead Language
2013: EP – Jackrabbit Starts
2013: Early Frost – Heiress
2015: 8894 - Banda de la Muerte
2015: Grief's Infernal Flower - Windhand
2016: Juventud Sónica - Artificiales
2016: Jardim-Pomar - Nando Reis
2016: Psychofiction EP - Wild Parade
2017: Post Tenebras Lux - Yajaira
2017: Escape - Denver Meatpacking Company
2018: Eternal Return - Windhand
2019: Cobain and Cornbread - The Black Tones
2019: Sunday Night Panic - Every Color Fades

2020: Mystic Goddess - Robots of the Ancient World
2021: Safety Off - Safety Off (recorded in 2007)
2021: Kick Out the Grams - The Foilies
2021: - Sonic Medicine
2021: “Worze than the cure”EP - WARTZ
2021: Nominal AF - The Starhoppers

Footnotes

External links 
Full Discography complete with notes
Singles Discography complete with notes

Production discographies